The Central Registry of War Criminals and Security Suspects, more commonly known as CROWCASS, was an organisation set up to assist the United Nations War Crimes Commission and Allied governments in tracing ex-enemy nationals suspected of committing war crimes or atrocities in Europe during the Second World War. The organisation was originally set up by the Supreme Headquarters Allied Expeditionary Force (SHAEF) in 1945.

The registry includes:
 Name - C.R. File Number - Rank - Occupation- Unit - Place and Date of Crime - Reason wanted - Wanted by

Royal Italian Army

5th Alpine Division "Pusteria" 
The names of two men attached to the 5th Alpine Division "Pusteria" can be found in the Central Registry of War Criminals and Security Suspects:

 CIPRIANI Nanni - 190931 - Colonel Royal Italian Army, Commanding Officer Battalion "Bolzano", "Pusteria"-Div., 11.41, Cetinji-Savrick, Podgorica (Yugoslavia) 7., 11.41 - Murder - Yugoslavia
 ESPOSITO Giovanni - 190952 - General, Royal Italian Army, "Pusteria"-Div., Montenegro, Savnik (Yugoslavia) 1941 - Murder - Yugoslavia

6th Alpine Division "Alpi Graie" 
The names of two men attached to the 6th Alpine Division "Alpi Graie" can be found in the Central Registry of War Criminals and Security Suspects:

 CIROTTI Mario; 190934; Lieutenant General, Royal Italian Army, "Alpi Graie"-Div., Savnik Montenegro (Yugoslavia), 5., 6., 9.42; Torture; Yugoslavia
 PANATELLO Francesco; 191051; Official, Royal Italian Army, "Alpi Graie"-Div., Montenegro (Yugoslavia) 42; Torture; Yugoslavia

6th Infantry Division "Cuneo" 
The names of three men attached to the 6th Infantry Division "Cuneo" can be found in the Central Registry of War Criminals and Security Suspects:

 ANTIMANTO Vittorio; 300006; Lieutenant of Reserve, 7 Infantry Regiment "Cuneo"-Div., Serifos (Greece) 11.41 - 9.43; Misc. Crimes; Greece;
 LENTI Nicholas - 300295 - Major and Governor, Inf., 7 Infantry Regiment "Cuneo"-Div. Military of Naxos during the Italian Occupation, Island of Naxos 41-43 - Misc. Crimes - Greece;
 BELANI Peter - 304292 - Private, Artillery "Cuneo"-Div. from Milan (Italy), Minia Platanou (Samos) (Greece), 6.4.43 - Murder - Greece.

12th Infantry Division "Sassari" 
The names of eight men attached to the 12th Infantry Division "Sassari" can be found in the Central Registry of War Criminals and Security Suspects:

 BARBA - 250049 - Major, "Sassari"-Div., Kistanje (Yugoslavia) 6.41 - Pillage - Yugoslavia;
 BARBERO Pietro - 250048 - Colonel, XVIII Army Corps "Sassari"-Div., Biograd Betina, Vodice (Yugoslavia) 42 - Murder - Yugoslavia
 BERARDI Pholo - 149616 - General, Commander, "Sassari"-Div. (Yugoslavia) 1943 - Murder - Yugoslavia
 BORRUZO Pietro 190904 - Major, Royal Italian Army, 3. Battery, 151. Regt. Fanteria, "Sassari"-Div., Fara Slovenia (Yugoslavia), summer 41 - Murder - Yugoslavia
 GAZZINI (or GAZZINO) - 190971 - Colonel, Royal Italian Army, Rgt. of "Sassari"-Div. (F 559), Udbina Gracac (Yugoslavia) 1. and 2.43 - Murder - Yugoslavia
 GIANOPECO Francesco - 147278 - General, Royal Italian Army "Sassari"-Div. (Yugoslavia) 43 - Murder - Yugoslavia
 GLORIA - 147272 - General, Royal Italian Army, "Lombardia" Rgt., "Sassari"-Div. (Yugoslavia) 43 - Murder - Yugoslavia
 ZANOTTI - 191020 - Colonel, Royal Italian Army, Commanding Officer Regt., "Sassari"-Div., F. 562, Udbina, Gracac (Yugoslavia) 2. and 3.43 - Murder - Yugoslavia

13th Infantry Division "Re" 
The names of three men attached to the 13th Infantry Division "Re" can be found in the Central Registry of War Criminals and Security Suspects:

 LANTIERI  - 145429 - Colonel, Army, "Re"-Div., Artillery Regiment, Slovenia, Croatia (Yugoslavia) 1943 - Murder - Yugoslavia;
 PALERMO - 191050 - Capt. of Carabinieri, Royal Italian Army, "Re"-Div., Otocac (Yugoslavia) 41-43 - Murder - Yugoslavia;
 PELLIGRA (alias: PELIGRA) - 148979 - General, "Re"-Div., Gornji-Kozar, Kotar-Caber (Yugoslavia) 43 - Murder - Yugoslavia

14th Infantry Division "Isonzo" 
The names of 51 men attached to the 14th Infantry Division "Isonzo" can be found in the Central Registry of War Criminals and Security Suspects:

 BANCALARI - 149624 - Army, 23. Regt. Fant "Como" "Isonzo"-Div., Cernomelj (Yugoslavia) 43 - Murder - Yugoslavia
 BERARDI Manlio - 149617 - Lieutenant Colonel, Isonzo-Div., 24 Infantry Regiment Como (Yugoslavia) 1943 - Murder - Yugoslavia
 BIGLIO Felice -307261 - Seniore, cmdt., 117 Battalion at Mouronog, 98 Fascist Legion attached to Isonzo-Div., 42-43 - Murder - Yugoslavia 
 BOLOGNE Vittorio - 144940 - Capt., 24. Infantry Regiment Como, Isonzo-Div. (Yugoslavia) 1943 - Murder - Yugoslavia 
 BONOMO Giovanni - 149630 - Tenente Medico, Army, 24 Infantry Regiment Como, Isonzo-Div., (Yugoslavia) 1943 - Murder - Yugoslavia 
 BURGIO Francesco - 145741 - Commander, Army, 98. Fascist Legion, "Isonzo" Div., Trebnje (Yugoslavia) 43 - Murder - Yugoslavia 
 CALZA Carlo - 149626 -Lt., 24. Infantry Regiment Como, II. Battalion, Isonzo-Div. (Yugoslavia) 1943 - Murder - Yugoslavia
 CARLI Giovanni - 145734 -Lieutenant Colonel, Isonzo-Div., Novo Mesto (Yugoslavia) 43 - Murder - Yugoslavia
 CASSETTO Pietro - 145729 -Major, 24.Infantry Regiment Como, Isonzo-Div., (Yugoslavia) 43 - Murder - Yugoslavia
 CIRILO Antonio - 145712 -Lt., Doctor, Isonzo-Div., 24 Infantry Regiment Como (Yugoslavia) 43 - Murder - Yugoslavia
 COCCOMARELLA Vincenzo - 145703 - Colonel, 24 Infantry Regiment Como, Isonzo-Div., Novo Mesto (Yugoslavia) 1943 - Murder - Yugoslavia
 CONSTANTINI Dr. Constantino - 145695 - Dr., Tenente Medico, 25 Infantry Regiment Como, Isonzo-Div., Cernomelj (Yugoslavia) 1943 - Murder - Yugoslavia
 CORONATI Emilio - 145690 - General, Inf. Div., Isonzo - part of XI Corpo d'Armata, Novo Mesto (Yugoslavia) 1942 - Murder - Yugoslavia
 DELMANTO Osvaldo - 150895 - Sottotenente, Royal Italian Army, Isonzo-Div. (Yugoslavia) 42-43 - Murder - Yugoslavia
 FARINA Guido - 148312 - Colonel, Army, Inf. Rgt. 23, "Como", "Isonzo"-Div., Cernomelj (Yugoslavia) 43 - Murder - Yugoslavia
 FERRARI Arturo - 148311 - Lt., Army, "Isonzo"-Div., 24 Inf. Rgt. "Como" (Yugoslavia) 43 - Murder - Yugoslavia
 FRACASSO Arsenio - 148305 - Dr., "Isonzo"-Div., 24 Inf. Rgt."Como" (Yugoslavia) 43 - Murder - Yugoslavia
 GALLI Giuseppe - 147286 - Sottotenente, 23 Rgt., Como, Royal Italian Army, Isonzo Div., 1 Battalion, - Murder - YugoslaviaCernomelj (Yugoslavia) 43
 GALLO Rufino - 147283 - Sottotenente, 24 Inf. Rgt., Royal Italian Army, Como, Isonzo Div. (Yugoslavia) 43 - Murder - Yugoslavia
 GIOVARELLI Fernando - 147275 - Sottotenente, Royal Italian Army, 23 Inf. Rgt. "Como", "Isonzo" Div., - Murder - Yugoslavia
 GIURA Luigi - 147273 - Centurione, Royal Italian Army, "Isonzo"-Div., 98 Fasc. Leg., 3 Coy, Trebnie (Yugoslavia) 43 - Murder - Yugoslavia
 GOBBO Dr. - 147271 - Dr., Tenente Medico, Royal Italian Army, 23 Inf. Rgt. "Como", "Isonzo"-Div., Cernomeli (Yugoslavia) 43 - Murder - Yugoslavia 
 Guazzo Angelo - 147267 - Colonel, Royal Italian Army, 6 Artl. Regt., Isonzo-Div., Novo Mesto (Yugoslavia) - Murder - Yugoslavia 
 GUERRINI Remo - 147265 - Centurione, Royal Italian Army, "Isonzo"-Div., 98 Fascist Legion, Velaloka (Yugoslavia) 1943 - Murder - Yugoslavia 
 GUTIERREZ A. - 147264 - Royal Italian Army, Isonzo-Div., 23 Regt. Como, Cernomeli (Yugoslavia) 43 - Murder - Yugoslavia
 LA SPADA Michelangelo - 146308 - Lt., Royal Italian Army, Isonzo-Div, 23 Infantry Regiment, Cernomels (Yugoslavia) 1943 - Murder - Yugoslavia
 LIPARI Ignazio - 145427 - Lieutenant Medico, Isonzo Div., 23 Inf. Rgt. Como, Cernomelj (Yugoslavia) 43 - Murder - Yugo 
 LODI Giorgio -¨145426 - Lieutenant Colonel, Isonzo Div., 23 Inf. Rgt. Como (Yugoslavia) 43 - Murder - Yugoslavia 
 LOUSIER (LOUVIER?) Edoardo - 145424 - Capt., "Isonzo" Div., 98 Fascist Legion, Trebnje (Yugoslavia) 43 - Murder - Yugoslavia 
 LO VULLO Luigi - 145423 - Major, Isonzo Div., 24 Inf. Rgt. Como (Yugoslavia) - Murder - Yugoslavia 
 MACCHI Antonio - 145480 - Capt., 24 Inf. Rgt. Como, III Battalion Isonzo Div. (Yugoslavia) 43 - Murder - Yugoslavia 
 MARAZZA A. - 145471 - Maggiore Aiutante, Isonzo Div., 23 Inf. Rgt. Como, Cernomelj (Yugoslavia) 43 - Murder - Yugoslavia 
 MARCHETTI Vincenzo - 145472 - Lt., Isonzo Div., 24 Inf. Rgt. Como (Yugoslavia) 43 - Murder - Yugoslavia
 MEZZI Adraste - 145484 - Lieutenant Colonel, "Isonzo"-Div., 24 Infantry Regiment"Como" (Yugoslavia) 1943 - Murder - Yugoslavia
 MOCCIA Alfonso - 145468 - Major, "Isonzo"-Div., 98 Fascist Legion, 117 Battalion, 1943 - Murder - Yugoslavia
 NONNI Dr. Carlo - 145636 - Lt., Doctor, Isonzo-Div., 24 Infantry Regiment "Como" (Yugoslavia) - Murder - Yugoslavia 
 ORIFICI Domenico - 148666 - Colonel, "Isonzo"-div., 24 Infantry Regiment "Como" , (Yugoslavia) 43 - Murder - Yugoslavia 
 ORIOLI Antonio - 148665 - Capt., "Isonzo"-Div., 98 Fascist Legion, 1 Coy., Rakovnik (Yugoslavia) 1943 - Murder - Yugoslavia 
 ORSONI Jose - 148663 - Lieutenant (Med.), "Isonzo"-Div., 23 Infantry Regiment "Como", Cernomelj (Yugoslavia) 43 - Murder - Yugoslavia 
 PELAZZI Antonio - 149078 - Colonel, Royal Italian Army, "Isonzo" Div., Trebnje (Yugoslavia) - Murder - Yugoslavia, UNWCC
 PINELLI Corrado - 149986 - Capt., Isonzo-Div., 23 Regt. Fant. Como, Royal Italian Army, Cernomelj (Yugoslavia) - Murder - Yugoslavia 
 POZZUOLI Angelo - 149088 - Lt., Royal Italian Army, "Isonzo"-Div., 24 Infantry Regiment "Como" (Yugoslavia) - Murder - Yugoslavia, UNWCC 
 RENZO Eduardo - 148642 - Capt., Army, Isonzo-Div., 24 Infantry Regiment "Como" (Yugoslavia) 43 - Murder - Yugoslavia 
 ROCCAFORTE Filadelfo - 191079 - Capt., Italy Army, 6 Art. Regt., "Isonzo"-Div., Commander, Straza (Yugoslavia) 43 - Murder - Yugoslavia 
 ROCCO G. - 148640 - Dr., Capt., "Isonzo"-Div., 23 Regt. "Como", Cernomelj (Yugoslavia) - 1943 - Murder - Yugoslavia
 ROSANO Raffaello - 148636 - Capt., "Isonzo" Div., 98, Fascist Legion, 43 - Murder - Yugoslavia 
 SAVARINO F. - 191094 - Major, Commander II Battalion 23 Inf. Rgt. Como, Isonzo Div., District of Cernomelj (Yugoslavia) 11.8.42 - Murder - Yugoslavia 
 SCARPERIA G. - 146316 - Lt.-Colonel, Royal Italian Army, "Isonzo" Div., 23 Rgt., Cernomelj (Yugoslavia) 43 - Murder - Yugoslavia
 SOFIA Mario - 146311 - Lt., Royal Italian Army, "Isonzo"-Div., 24 Infantry Regiment, 1 Battalion, (Yugoslavia) 45 - Murder - Yugoslavia
 SPERANDIO Rinaldo - 146307 - Cpl., Royal Italian Army, "Isonzo"-Div., 98 Legion, 3 Coy., 117 Battalion, 1943 - Murder - Yugoslavia
 ZANNI Enzo - 144989 - Lt., Royal Italian Army, "Isonzo"-Div., 24 Infantry Regiment "Como", (Yugoslavia) 1943 - Murder - Yugoslavia

15th Infantry Division "Bergamo" 
The names of three men attached to the 15th Infantry Division "Bergamo" can be found in the Central Registry of War Criminals and Security Suspects:

 FORESIO – 190961 – Commandant, Royal Italian Army, Div. "Bergamo", Sibenik (Yugoslavia) 9.6.43 – Murder – Yugoslavia;
 GRIMALDI Paolo – 190980 – Lieutenant General, Royal Italian Army Div. "Bergamo", Sibenik (Yugoslavia) 41–43 – Murder – Yugoslavia;
 PIAZZONI – 149085 – Lieutenant General, Royal Italian Army, "Bergamo" Div., Bickovo (Yugoslavia) 42 – Torture – Yugoslavia

18th Infantry Division "Messina" 
The names of eight men attached to the 18th Infantry Division "Messina" can be found in the Central Registry of War Criminals and Security Suspects:

 AMATO Attilio - 195528 - General, Royal Italian Army, Div. Messina, Korcula (Yugoslavia) 15.1.43 - Murder - Yugoslavia
 CAPRIOLO Giorgio - 190914 - Adjutant, Div. Messina, aide de camp, Berane (Yugoslavia) 7.-9.41 - Murder - Yugoslavia
 MARUSSICH (or MARUSIC) - 191008 - Agent, Capt., Pol.-Ital., C.C., Div. Messina, Montenegro, Fraschette Alatri (Yugoslavia; Italy) 41-42 - Murder - Yugoslavia
 NICOSIA Salvatore - 191154 - Major, Inf.Div. Messina", Procuratore dell'Imperatore, Cetinje (Yugoslavia) 1941 - Murder - Yugoslavia
 OGRISSEC - 191044 - Capt., Royal Italian Army, Div. "Messina", Montenegro (Yugoslavia) 13.7.41, spring 1942 - Murder - Yugoslavia
 PAVISSICH - 191057 - Capt., Royal Italian Army, Div. "Messino", Montenegro (Yugoslavia) 13.7.41-42 - Murder - Yugoslavia
 RAGOZZI Guido - 191075 - Lieutenant Colonel, Royal Italian Army, Commander of Battalion of the Div. "Messina", Prov. Montenegro (Yugoslavia) 31.7.41-spring 42 - Murder - Yugoslavia
 TUCCI Carlo - 193558 - Lieutenant General, G.Commanding Officer "Messina" Div., Montenegro (Yugoslavia) 7.41 - Murder - Yugoslavia

19th Infantry Division "Venezia" 
The names of twelve men attached to the 19th Infantry Division "Venezia" can be found in the Central Registry of War Criminals and Security Suspects:

 BASOLCHI - 259134 - Maggiore, cmdt., Venezia Div., Battalion Bijelo Polje, Montenegro 41-43 - Misc. Crimes - Yugoslavia 
 BONGIOVANNI Giuseppe - 190902 - Colonel, Royal Italian Army, 1 Battalion 83. Regt. Div. "Venezia", Podgorica Montenegro (Yugoslavia) 9., 10. 11.41, 8-43 - Murder - Yugoslavia
 BONINI Silvio - 189907 - Generale-Commandant, Div. Venezia, Berane, Montenegro 41-43 - Suspect - Yugoslavia
 BULIONI Italo - 259132 - Major, Venezia Div., 1 Battalion, 84. Regt., Andrijevica Montenegro (Yugoslavia) 8.41-9.42 - Misc. Crimes - Yugoslavia
 CERETANI - 189902 - Major, Venezia Army, Montenegro (Yugoslavia) - Pillage - Yugoslavia
 CRISTICIANI David (1918) - 259174 - Tenente, deputy Carabinieri Commander, Venezia-Div., Berane Montenegro (Yugoslavia) 41-43 - Misc. Crimes - Yugoslavia
 FOPIANO Mario - 190960 - Major, Royal Italian Army, Battalion of "Venezia", Div., Kolasin and Area (Yugoslavia) 8.43 - Murder - Yugoslavia
 GIMELLI Fernando - 259129 - Maggiore, Commandant, II Battalion, 84 Rgt., Venezia Div., Berane Montenegro 41-43 - Misc. crimes - Yugoslavia
 GUGLIOTTI - 302151 - Lt., 8 Coy., 2 Battalion, 83 Regt., "Venezia"-Div., Montenegro (Yugoslavia) 9.-11.41 and 8.43 - Murder - Yugoslavia 
 MARINO Umberto - 191004 - Commandant, Royal Italian Army, II Battalion, 8 Coy, Div. Venezia, Trebsljevo-Kolasin (Yugoslavia) 41 - Murder - Yugoslavia
 PISTOGLIESI - 259108 - Carabiniere, "Venezia"-Div., Berane Montenegro (Yugoslavia) 8.41-9.43 - Misc. crimes - Yugoslavia
 SCONOCHI Paolo (circa 1911) - 259127 - Capt., Cmdt., Carabinieri, Venezia-Div., Berane (Yugoslavia) 8.42-9.43 - Misc. crimes - Yugoslavia

21st Infantry Division "Granatieri di Sardegna" 
The names of four men attached to the 21st Infantry Division "Granatieri di Sardegna" can be found in the Central Registry of War Criminals and Security Suspects:

 ORLANDO Taddeo - 148664 - General, "Granatieri di Sardegna" Div., XI Army Corps (Yugoslavia) 43 - Murder - Yugoslavia
 PASQUALE Giuseppe - 253276 - Chief, 21 Battalion Sardinia Gren. Div. Executive Section, Ljubljana (Yugoslavia) 42 - Misc. crimes - Yugoslavia
 PERNA U. - 191060 - Commander, Royal Italian Army, 2 "Granatieri di Sardegna", Blocice Slovenia (Yugoslavia) 25.-28.6.42 - Pillage - Yugoslavia
 ZANINI - 250586 - Chief, Ex. Off., 21 Battalion, Sardinia Gren.-Div., Ljubljana (Yugoslavia) 42 - Torture - Yugoslavia

22nd Infantry Division "Cacciatori delle Alpi" 
The names of two men attached to the 22nd Infantry Division "Cacciatori delle Alpi" can be found in the Central Registry of War Criminals and Security Suspects:

 PIVANO - 191068 - General, Royal Italian Army commander of "Cacciatori delle Alpi", Dubide Niksic (Yugoslavia) 10.8.41 - Torture - Yugoslavia;
 RUGGERO Vittorio - 148635 - General - "Cacciatori delle Alpi" Div., Ljubljana (Yugoslavia) 43 - Murder - Yugoslavia

23rd Infantry Division "Ferrara" 
The names of twelve men attached to the 23rd Infantry Division "Ferrara" can be found in the Central Registry of War Criminals and Security Suspects:

 BOCCA - 190899 - Colonel, Royal Italian Army, 82. Battalion, Div. Ferrara, Sarnik Montenegro (Yugoslavia) 5.,6.43 - Murder - Yugoslavia
 CIPRIANI - 190932 - Cpl., Royal Italian Army, Div. Ferrara, Kapino-Polje (Yugoslavia) 6.43 - Murder - Yugoslavia
 DAVELA Giuseppe - 190946 - Officer, Royal Italian Army, Div. Ferrara, Rastok, Montenegro (Yugoslavia) 3.42 - Murder - Yugoslavia
 FRANCESCHINI Mario - 190963 - General, Royal Italian Army, Div. Ferrara, Savnik Montenegro (Yugoslavia) 5.-6.42 - Murder - Yugoslavia
 GERMANO Francesco - 190976 - Colonel, Royal Italian Army, Unit Ferrara Div., Montenegro (Yugoslavia) 5.43 - Murder - Yugoslavia
 GUIDO Francesco - 190982 - Sgt., Royal Italian Army, Div. "Ferrara", Kapino Polje Montenegro (Yugoslavia) 6.43 - Murder - Yugoslavia
 MAINERI - 193553 - Lt.General, Royal Italian Army, Commander of 23 "Ferrara"-Div., Niksic (Yugoslavia) - Murder - Yugoslavia
 PANARELLI Francesco	149074	Lt., Royal Italian Army "Ferrara" Div., Carabinieri, Montenegro (Yugoslavia) - Murder - Yugoslavia
 ROSCIOLI Giuseppe - 191085 - Colonel, Royal Italian Army, 47 Rgt."Dolla" Div. "Ferrara", Savnik, Montenegro (Yugoslavia) 43 - Murder - Yugoslavia
 SANTIS DE VINCENZO Eugenio - 191165 - Commander, III Btty. 14 Artillery Rgt., Ferrara Div., Savnik Montenegro (Yugoslavia) 5.-6.43 - Murder - U.K.
 TABANELLI - 191122 - Fascist, Officer of C.C., N.N. at Ferrara Div., Kapino Polje Nikso, Montenegro (Yugoslavia) 6.43 - Murder - Yugoslavia
 ZONI Francesco - 144987 - Officer, Royal Italian Army, Ferrara-Div., Montenegro (Yugoslavia) 1943 - Murder - Yugoslavia

24th Infantry Division "Pinerolo" 
The names of five men attached to the 24th Infantry Division "Pinerolo" can be found in the Central Registry of War Criminals and Security Suspects:

 BENELI (or BENELLI) - 300174 - Lieutenant Colonel, "Pinerolo" Div., C.C. Larissa Andarea 41-43 - Murder - Greece
 DEL GIUDICE - 300613 - Colonel, Maj-Gen., Commander of the Pinerolo-Div., Town-Mayor of Kastoria, officer commanding Occupation Army, Kastoria, Nestorion, Argos, Orestikon (Greece) 42-43 - Murder - Greece 
 FESTI Antonio - 300249 - Major, Commanding a Battalion, Blackshirts, Pinerolo-Div., Elassona Area, Domenika, Livadia, 1.10.42-16.2.43 - Murder - Greece 
 INFANTE Adolfo - 305195 - Lieutenant General, Commander, "Pinerolo"-Div., Almiros, Thessaly (Greece) 15.8.-18.8.43 - Misc. Crimes - Greece 
 VALI Antonio - 305340 - Major, Commanding Officer, 120 Battalion of Blackshirts quartered at Elassona, Pinerolo Div., Elassona Area (Greece) 42-43 - Misc. crimes - Greece

32nd Infantry Division "Marche" 
The names of 29 men attached to the 32nd Infantry Division "Marche" can be found in the Central Registry of War Criminals and Security Suspects:

 BIZARRI Vincenzo - 259099 - Capt., Royal Italian Army, 56. Regt., Marche Div., Stolac (Yugoslavia) 4.41-9.42 - Murder - Yugoslavia
 BUCARI Giorgio - 259106 -Lieutenant Royal Italian Army, 56. Regt., "Marche"-Div., Stolag (Yugoslavia) 4.41-9.42 - Murder - Yugoslavia 
 BULLO Attilio - 259194 - Lt., Royal Italian Army, Marche-Div., 56. Regt. Stolac (Yugoslavia) 4.41-9.42 - Murder - Yugoslavia 
 CAPIGATI GIUSEPPE - 259105 - Lt.Colonel Royal Italian Army, 56.Regt. "Marche" Div., Stolag (Yugoslavia) - 4.41-9.42 - Murder - Yugoslavia 
 CAPITANO Gino - 190913 - Major Royal Italian Army, 55.Regt. "Marche" Div., Trebine (Yugoslavia) 20.4.41-8.9.43 - Murder - Yugoslavia 
 CARELLI Giuseppe - 190915 - Major, Royal Italian Army, 53. Regt., Marche Div., Trebinje (Yugoslavia) 20.4.41-8.9.43 - Murder - Yugoslavia 
 CAVALERRI Giorgio - 259123 - Lt., Royal Italian Army, 56 Regt., Marche-Div., Stolag (Yugoslavia) 4.41-9.42 - Murder - Yugoslavia 
 CIAMPAULO Rolando - 259104 - Lieutenant Royal Italian Army, 56 Regt., Marche-Div., Stolac (Yugoslavia) 4.41-9.42 - Murder - Yugoslavia 
 DAGLI ALBERI Delio - 259100 - Lt., Royal Italian Army, 56. Regt., Marche-Div., Stolac (Yugoslavia) 4.41-9.42 - Murder - Yugoslavia 
 DE GUIDA - 190981 - Colonel Royal Italian Army, 51 Regt. of Marche-Div., Trebinje (Yugoslavia) 42-43 - Murder - Yugoslavia 
 FALCOMARE Marcello - 259193 - Lt., Royal Italian Army, "Marche" Div., 56 Rgt., Stolac (Yugoslavia) 41-9.42 - Murder - Yugoslavia 
 FARESSIN Emilio - 259192 - Lt., Royal Italian Army, "Marche"-Div., 56. Rgt., Stolac (Yugoslavia) 4.41-9.42 - Murder - Yugoslavia 
 FISCHETTI Ettore - 190959 - Lt., Royal Italian Army, 56 Inf. Rgt., 1 Battalion, I A Coy., Div. "Marche", Mostar (Yugoslavia) 42 - Pillage - Yugoslavia 
 GUGLIELMINO Antonio - 259103 - Lt., Royal Italian Army, 56 Regt., "Marche"-Div., Stolac (Yugoslavia) 4.41-9.42 - Murder - Yugoslavia 
 INGEGNI Pasquale - 259121 - Lt., Royal Italian Army, 56 Regt., "Marche"-Div., Stolac (Yugoslavia) 4.41-9.42 - Murder - Yugoslavia 
 LUCIANO - 259190 - Lieutenant Royal Italian Army, Marche Div., 56 Rgt., Stolac (Yugoslavia) 4.41-9.42 - Murder - Yugoslavia 
 LUPARELLI Enzo - 259189 - Lieutenant Royal Italian Army, Marche Div., 56 Rgt., Stolac (Yugoslavia) 4.41-9.42 - Murder - Yugoslavia 
 LUSANO Alexandro - 190994 - Lt., General, Royal Italian Army, 55 Rgt. "Marche" Div., Trebinje (Yugoslavia) 41-43 - Murder - Yugoslavia 
 MONTALTO Rino - 191031 -  Capt. of Carabinieri, Royal Italian Army, 55 Regt., "Marche"-Div., Trebinje (Yugoslavia) 20.4.41- 8.9.43 - Murder - Yugoslavia 
 MONTESSI Enzo - 259122 - Lt., Royal Italian Army, 56 Regt. "Marche"-Div., Stolac (Yugoslavia) 4.41-9.42 - Murder - Yugoslavia 
 MUSSI Bruno - 259188 - Lt., Royal Italian Army, "Marche"-Div., 56 Regt., Stolac (Yugoslavia) 4.41-9.42 - Murder - Yugoslavia 
 NOLLI Stefano - 259120 - Lt., Royal Italian Army, 56 Regt., "Marche"-Div., Stolac (Yugoslavia) 4.41-8.42 - Murder - Yugoslavia 
 PELEGRINO Alessandro - 259187 - Lt., Royal Italian Army, "Marche" Div. 56 Div., Stolac (Yugoslavia) 4.41-9.42 - Murder - Yugoslavia 
 PITARRELLO Romoaldo - 259186 - Lt., Royal Italian Army, Marche-Div., 56 Regt., Stolac (Yugoslavia) 4.41-9.42 - Murder - Yugoslavia 
 PIGNATELLI Antonio - 191065 - Colonel, Royal Italian Army, 55 Regt., "Marche"-Div., Trebinje (Yugoslavia) 20.4.41-8.9.43 - Murder - Yugoslavia 
 SERENTINO Pietro - 259098 - Lt., Royal Italian Army, 56 Regt., "Marche"-Div., Stolac (Yugoslavia) 4.41-9.42 - Murder - Yugoslavia 
 SPAGNA - 191112 - Capt., 56 Infantry Regiment, 1 Battalion, 1 Coy., Div. "Marche", Mostar (Yugoslavia) 7.42 - Pillage - Yugoslavia 
 TADDEO Sergio - 191124 - Lt., 55 Regt. "Marche" Div., Trebinje (Yugoslavia) 20.4.41-8.9.43 - Murder - Yugoslavia 
 TAGLIO Pietro - 259185 - Lt., Royal Italian Army 56 Regt. "Marche"-Div., Stolac (Yugoslavia) 4.41-9.42 - Murder - Yugoslavia

36th Infantry Division "Forlì" 
The names of four men attached to the 36th Infantry Division "Forlì" can be found in the Central Registry of War Criminals and Security Suspects:

 BOTIGLIANI (or MONTIGLIANI); 300190; Capt. or Lt., "Forlì" Div., CC. Larissa 41–43; Murder; Greece
 CAVANO – 300205 – Capt., Forlì-Div., C.C. Larissa 41–43 – Murder – Greece
 DALESSIO – 300212 – Capt. or Lt., "Forlì" Div., C.C. Larissa 41–43 – Murder – Greece
 UGOLINI Renato – 305396 – Commandant, 42 Rgt. Forlì Div., Davlia (Greece) 5.5.43 – Murder – Greece

48th Infantry Division "Taro" 
The names of four men attached to the 48th Infantry Division "Taro" can be found in the Central Registry of War Criminals and Security Suspects:

 MELINI - 191011 - Major, Royal Italian Army, Div. Taro, Gradjome, Radomir, Montenegro (Yugoslavia) 5.42 - Pillage - Yugoslavia;
 ORIOLI E. - 191046 - Major, Royal Italian Army, Deputy Chief of staff, "Taro" Div., Crna Gora (Yugoslavia) 41 - Murder - Yugoslavia;
 PEDRAZOLI - 149077 - General, Royal Italian Army, Tarro-Div., Montenegro (Yugoslavia) - Murder - Yugoslavia;
 SPITALERI - 193556 - Major, Royal Italian Army "Tarro"-Div., Budva, Banovina, Zevska (Yugoslavia) 41 - Murder - Yugoslavia

57th Infantry Division "Lombardia" 
The names of 14 men attached to the 57th Infantry Division "Lombardia" can be found in the Central Registry of War Criminals and Security Suspects:

 ALZETTA - 146104 - Lt., Royal Italian Army, Lombardia-Div., Slovenia Croatia (Yugoslavia) 1943 - Murder - Yugoslavia
 BERANI - 149618 - Lieutenant Army, Lombardia-Div., 73 Regt., 3 Battalion, (Yugoslavia) 1943 - Murder - Yugoslavia
 BESTA Fabio - 149613 - Colonel, Army, Lombardia-Div., 73. Infantry Regiment (Yugoslavia) 43 - Murder - Yugoslavia
 D'ORO - 150890 - Capt., Royal Italian Army, Div. Lombardia, Fuzine (Yugoslavia) 1942 - Murder - Yugoslavia
 FACCIN - 148316 - Colonel, Commander, Army, Infantry Regiment 73, Lombardia-Div., 41-43 - Murder - Yugoslavia
 FERRONI - 148310 - Colonel Commander, Army, 74 Inf. Rgt., "Lombardia" Div. (Yugoslavia) 43 - Murder - Yugoslavia
 FLORENTINI - 148307 - Major, "Lombardia"-Div., 73 Rgt., 3 Battalion (Yugoslavia) - Murder - Yugoslavia
 GALLINI - 147285 - Major, Royal Italian Army, 73 Inf. Rgt. "Lombardia" Div. (Yugoslavia) 43 - Murder - Yugoslavia
 GAROLFO (or GAROFOLO) - 147281 - Lt., Royal Italian Army, Lombardia Div., 73 Rgt., 1 Battalion (Yugoslavia) 43 - Murder - Yugoslavia
 LUZENTE - 145419 - Major, Lombardia Div., 73., Rgt., 1 Battalion, Slovenia Croatia (Yugoslavia) 43 - Murder - Yugoslavia
 PALPINELLI - 179073 - Lt., Royal Italian Army, "Lombardia" Div., 73 Rgt., 3 Battalion, Slovenia Croatia (Yugoslavia) - Murder - Yugoslavia
 PITAU - 149087 - Lieutenant General, Royal Italian Army, "Lombardia"-Div. (Yugoslavia) 43 - Murder - Yugoslavia
 VILIERO - 148388 - Chief, Lt.Colonel, Staff, "Lombardia"-Div., (Yugoslavia) 43 - Murder - Yugoslavia
 ZATTI (or ZATI) - 144988 - Lieutenant General, Royal Italian Army, Lomardia-Div., Fuzine (Yugoslavia) 1943 - Murder - Yugoslavia

154th Infantry Division "Murge" 
The names of twelve men attached to the 154th Infantry Division "Murge" can be found in the Central Registry of War Criminals and Security Suspects:

 CANINO Ignacio - 190912 - Commanding Officer Royal Italian Army, 259 Regt. of "Murge" Div., Trebine, Boski, Jubine (Yugoslavia) 43 - Murder - Yugoslavia 
 CIRILO Antonio - 190933Lieutenant Colonel, Royal Italian Army, 51 Regt. of Murge-Div., Trebinje (Yugoslavia) 42-43 - Murder - Yugoslavia
 MELIS - 145475 - Lt., Lombardia-Div., 23 Regt., 3 Battalion, Slovenia, Croatia (Yugoslavia) 1943 - Murder - Yugoslavia
 MOCCIA Alfonso - 145468 - Major, "Isonzo"-Div., 98 Fascist Legion, 117 Battalion, 1943 - Murder - Yugoslavia
 RAVENI - 148643 - Colonel, Army, "Lombardia"-Div., 57 Artl. Regt., Slovenia, Croatia (Yugoslavia) - Murder - Yugoslavia
 ROCI Viciano - 191080 - Lt., Italy Army, 259 Regt., "Murge"-Div., Trebinje, Ljiubine (Yugoslavia) 42-43 - Murder - Yugoslavia
 ROSETI - 191086 - Lt., Royal Italian Army, Murge Div., 51 Rgt., Trebinje (Yugo) 42-43 - Murder - Yugoslavia
 SAVIOLA Giorgio - 191095 - Lt.Colonel, Royal Italian Army, 51 Rgt. of Murge, Prison, Trebuje Area (Yugo) 42-43 - Murder - Yugoslavia
 SOLDANO Vincenzo - 191111 - Major, 259 Regt., "Murge"-Div., Trebinje Iboski Sume Ljubine Ljubomir (Yugoslavia) 42-43 - Murder - Yugoslavia
 SPOLETI (or SPALATINI) - 191117 - Lt., 51 Regt. of "Murge"-Div., Iboski, Ljubine, Sume (Yugoslavia) 42-43 - Murder - Yugoslavia
 TONETI (or CAPELINI) - 191130 - Capt., Royal Italian Army, 51 Rgt. of "Murge" Div., Trebinje Area, Villages of Iboski, Ljubine, Sume, Ljubomir (Yugoslavia) 42-43 - Murder - Yugoslavia
 Verdi Hugo - 191137 - Colonel, Royal Italian Army, 51 Rgt. of Murge Div., Sibenik (Yugoslavia) 41-43 - Murder - Yugoslavia

158th Infantry Division "Zara" 
The names of five men attached to the 158th Infantry Division "Zara" can be found in the Central Registry of War Criminals and Security Suspects:

 BADINI Andrea - 255507 - Major, 291. Infantry Regiment Zara Div., Kistanje (Yugoslavia) 42 - Brutality - Yugoslavia 
 DAMIANI DE VERGADA Pietro (circa '13) - 259168 - Cmdt., 291 Regt. of the Zara Div., Kistanje, Piramatovci, Banja (Yugoslavia) 17.8.42, 3.43, 22.4.43 - Misc. Crimes - Yugoslavia
 FLAVONI Giulio - 255135 - Major, Army, Zara-Div., 291 Rgt., Kistanje (Yugoslavia) 42 - Brutality - Yugoslavia
 SENATORE Aldo - 191101 - Major, Royal Italian Army, Commander of Inf. Div. Zara, Sibenik (Yugoslavia) 41-43 - Murder - Yugoslavia
 VIALE Carlo - 191138 - General, Royal Italian Army, Com. of "Zara"-Div., Sibenik (Yugoslavia) 41-43 - Murder - Yugoslavia

References 

International judicial organizations
Organizations established in 1945